Clemens August Busch (10 May 1834 – 25 November 1895) was a German diplomat.

Busch was born in Cologne. He served as acting head of the Foreign Office from 25 June to 16 July 1881, succeeding Count Friedrich of Limburg Stirum, until he was replaced by Paul von Hatzfeld, until then the Ambassador to Constantinople.

He died in Berne.

1834 births
1895 deaths
People from Cologne
Foreign Secretaries of Germany
19th-century German diplomats